Lozzi is a surname. Notable people with the surname include:

Edward Lozzi, American publicist
Vincent Lozzi (born 1932), American politician

Italian-language surnames